Frederick Irby, 2nd Baron Boston (1749–1825) was an English peer, landowner, and courtier.

Early life
Frederick Irby was born on 9 June 1749, the son of William Irby, 1st Baron Boston and Albinia Selwyn. He was educated at Eton College. He graduated from Oxford University on 8 July 1763 with a Doctor of Civil Laws (D.C.L.), and from St. John's College, Cambridge, in 1769 with a Master of Arts (M.A.).

He succeeded his father as 3rd Baronet Irby, of Whapload and Boston and 2nd Baron Boston, on 30 March 1775.

Marriage and children
He married Christian Methuen, daughter of Paul Methuen and Catharine Cobb of Corsham Court, Wiltshire, on 15 May 1775.

They had thirteen children, including:
 George Irby, 3rd Baron Boston b. 27 Dec 1777, d. 12 Mar 1856
 Rear-Admiral Frederick Paul Irby  b. 18 Apr 1779, d. 24 Apr 1844
 Lt.-Col. Henry Edward Irby b. 27 Aug 1783, d. 9 Mar 1821, who fought at the Battle of Waterloo and died the service of the 1st West India Regiment.
 Paul Anthony Irby b. 16 Dec 1784, d. 10 Feb 1865, married Patience Champion de Crespigny, and became Vicar of Cottesbrook.
 Edward Methuen Irby b. 21 Mar 1788, d. 27 Jul 1809 at the Battle of Talavera.
 Captain Charles Leonard Irby  b. 9 Oct 1789, d. 3 Dec 1845, traveller in the Middle East 1789-1845, author of “Travels in Egypt and Nubia, Syria, and Asia Minor; during the years 1817 & 1818” and “Travels in Egypt and Nubia, Syria, and the Holy Land” (1852) 
 Anne Maria Louisa Irby b. 2 Oct 1792, d. 19 Dec 1870, married Henry Peachey, 3rd Baron Selsey.

Life and work 
In 1778, Irby built a new mansion at his estate at Hedsor House, near Taplow, Buckinghamshire. An engraving of the manor, by his brother-in-law Archdeacon John Gooch, is now in the British Museum.

An amateur etcher, Irby was invested as a Fellow of the Society of Antiquaries (F.S.A.) on 8 January 1778.

In later life he was a courtier, holding the office of Lord of the Bedchamber to both George III and George IV, from 1780 until his death in 1825. King George III was godfather to Irby’s oldest son and heir, George, at his baptism on 28 January 1778.

Irby died on 23 March 1825, aged 75, at Lower Grosvenor Street, Mayfair, London. His widow died on 9 May 1832.

References

1749 births
1825 deaths
Alumni of St John's College, Cambridge
2
People from Taplow